This is a list of the six members of the European Parliament for Malta in the 2019 to 2024 session.

List

Party representation

References

Malta
List
2019